Ronald George Arthur Chesterman (27 November 1939 – 16 March 2007) was an English musician. He is best known as the original double bass player with The Strawberry Hills Boys, starring Dave Cousins on guitar, dulcimer, banjo and vocals, Tony Hooper on guitar and vocals and Ron himself on double bass. They kept that name from 1964 when they formed until June 1967, when they were giving a concert and needed to put the name of the band on stage, so they became The Strawbs. Later, after he left the band, he became a county archivist in Chester.

Discography
 Steve Benbow 
 Songs of Ireland (1966) - With David Cousins on banjo, Denny Wright on guitar, Jack Fallon on bass, Steve Benbow on guitar and vocals and The Strawberry Hills Boys : David Cousins, Tony Hooper and Ron Chesterman on backing vocals. Monitor MFS LP MFS 447 Label.

 Tea & Symphony  
 An Asylum For The Musically Insane (1969) - With Dave Clem Clempson, Gus Dudgeon, etc. - Ron played double bass on Travelling Shoes.

 Strawbs 
- Singles :
"Oh How She Changed/Or Am I Dreaming" (1968)
"The Man Who Called Himself Jesus/Poor Jimmy Wilson" (1968)

- Studio albums : 
Strawbs (1969)
Strawberry Sampler Number 1 (1969) 
Dragonfly (1970) - With Rick Wakeman on piano & Tony Visconti on recorder. 
Sandy Denny & The Strawbs : All Our Own Work (1973)

- Compilation albums :
Early Strawbs (1974) - Double album 
Classic Strawbs (1977) - Double album 
Sandy Denny & The Strawbs (1991) 
Preserves Uncanned (1991) 
Halcyon Days 1997) - Double album
Strawberry Sampler Number 1 (2001)
The Collection (2002) 
Tears and Pavan (2002) 
The Witchwood Project (2006) Ron plays on one song, The happiest boy in town with The Strawberry Hill Boys. 
A taste of Strawbs (2006) 5-CD Box Set - Ron Double bass on 15 songs. 
Sandy Denny & The Strawbs : All our own work: CD - The Complete Sessions (2010) 2 CD 
Strawbs at The BBC - Volume 1 - In Session (2010) 
Of a time (2012) - With John Paul Jones, Nicky Hopkins, Tony Hooper, etc. 
Sandy Denny & The Strawbs : All our own work (2014) - 2 LP Vinyl Reissue Includes Original Album Release + Out-takes & Demos & Previously Unreleased Demos. 
Witchwood: The Very Best Of (2014)

 Bernie Taupin 
 Bernie Taupin (1970) - Shawn Phillips on guitar, sitar, koto and vocals.

 Magna Carta 
 Songs From Wasties Orchard (1971) - With Rick Wakeman, Nic Potter, Danny Thompson, Davey Johnstone, Chris Simpson, etc.

 The Crown Folk 
 More Folk In Worship (1974)

References 
 Steve Benbow : https://www.discogs.com/Steve-Benbow-With-Strawberry-Hill-Boys-Songs-Of-Ireland/release/5376196

External links
http://www.strawbsweb.co.uk/ The Strawbs website
http://www.strawbsweb.co.uk/45s/4568.asp
Ron Chesterman on Strawbsweb
1968 Promotional Pack on Strawbsweb
 http://www.strawbsweb.co.uk/ix_albs.asp

1943 births
People from Chester
English rock musicians
English double-bassists
Male double-bassists
2007 deaths
Strawbs members
20th-century double-bassists
20th-century British male musicians